Jenny James  is a British orienteer.

She competed at the 1999 World Orienteering Championships in Inverness, where she placed fourth in the relay with the British team.

She won a bronze medal in the relay with the British team at the 2000 European Orienteering Championships in Truskavets, along with Yvette Baker and Heather Monro.

At the 2001 World Orienteering Championships in Tampere, she placed fifth with the British relay team.

She was British Champion in 2001, and Nights Champion in 1997 and 2000.

References

Year of birth missing (living people)
Living people
British orienteers
Foot orienteers
Competitors at the 2001 World Games